Simon Canuel (29 October 1767 – 11 May 1840) was a French general of the Revolutionary and Napoleonic Wars.

Biography
Canuel was born in Les Trois-Moutiers, in the Vienne.

French Revolutionary Wars

In April 1796, general-in-chief, Canuel led the campaign against a counter-revolutionary movement in Sancerrois, led by Antoine Le Picard de Phélippeaux.

First Empire
Napoleon I decided not to put Canuel on active service, keeping him in command of various quiet strongholds. Bored at the inaction, he went over to the Bourbons in 1814 and so during the Hundred Days the following year had to take refuge among the Royalist insurgents of the Vendée.

Later on, he took part in several conflicts including the Hundred Thousand Sons of Saint Louis mission in Spain.

Death
He died on May 11, 1840 in Loudun.

References

Sources
Marie-Nicolas Bouillet and Alexis Chassang (ed.s), "Simon Canuel" in Dictionnaire universel d’histoire et de géographie, 1878
 

1767 births
1840 deaths
French generals
French military personnel of the Napoleonic Wars
People from Vienne